Margot Sunderland is a British child psychologist and psychotherapist. She is Director of Education and Training at the Centre for Child Mental Health  and Honorary Visiting Fellow at London Metropolitan University at London Metropolitan University. She has been working with families and children for over 30 years. She is the author of over twenty books in the field of child mental health, which collectively have been translated into eighteen languages and published in 24 countries.

Her internationally acclaimed book, The Science of Parenting won First Prize in the British Medical Association Medical Book awards 2007 Popular Medicine section. The book, endorsed by the affective neuroscientist Professor Jaak Panksepp, is the result of ten years research on the long-term effects of adult-child interaction on the developing brain. The book has also been voted one of the top brain books of our time by the Dana Foundation. Her books which form the "Helping Children with Feelings" series are used as key therapeutic tools by child professionals.
 
Sunderland is also Chief Executive and Founding Director of the Institute for Arts and Therapy in Education, an Independent Higher Education College and academic partner of University of East London, training child psychotherapists, child counsellors and art therapists. Sunderland has written or co-written master's degree programmes, unique in the field of child mental health e.g.  MA Integrative Child Psychotherapy and MA Education: Emotional Literacy for Children. She is also founder of the 'Helping Where it Hurts' programme which offers free arts therapy to troubled children in Islington Primary schools.

Publications and media

Margot Sunderland (2019) Communication Skills and Attachment Play: The First Five Years. DVD, Redshark TV.
Margot Sunderland (2019) Sensory Enhanced Learning and Attachment Play for 5 to 12 year olds. DVD, Redshark TV.
Margot Sunderland (2019) Draw on Your Relationships. Second edition (illustrations by Nicky Armstrong), Routledge.
Margot Sunderland (2018) Draw on Your Emotions. Second edition (illustrations by Nicky Armstrong), Routledge.
Margot Sunderland (2018) The Emotion Cards, (illustrations by Nicky Armstrong), Routledge.
Margot Sunderland (2018) The Relationship Cards, (illustrations by Nicky Armstrong), Routledge.
Margot Sunderland (2015) Best Relationship with your Child: The First Five Years. DVD, Redshark TV.
Margot Sunderland (2015) Best Relationship with your Child: Creative Quality Time. DVD, Redshark TV. 
Margot Sunderland (2015) Best Relationship with your Child: age 5 to 12. DVD, Redshark TV.
Margot Sunderland (2015) "Conversations that Matter". Worth Publishing. 
Margot Sunderland, Nicky Armstrong (Illustrator)(2013) "Helping Children with Troubled Parents: A Guidebook (Helping Children with Feelings)". Speechmark Publishing Ltd. 
Margot Sunderland, Nicky Armstrong (Illustrator) (2013)."Monica Plum's Horrid Problem (Helping Children with Feelings)". Speechmark Publishing Ltd. 
Margot Sunderland (2012). Bothered: Helping Teenagers to Talk about their Feelings. Speechmark Publishing Ltd. 
Margot Sunderland (2012). Helping Teenagers with Anger & Low Self-Esteem. Hinton House Publishers Ltd. 
Margot Sunderland (2008). Smasher: A Story to Help Adolescents with Anger & Alienation: A Story to Help Teenagers with Anger and Alienation. Hinton House Publishers Ltd. 
Margot Sunderland (2008). The Science of Parenting. DK ADULT. 
Margot Sunderland (2007). What Every Parent Needs to Know: The incredible effects of love, nurture and play on your child's development. DK ADULT. 
Margot Sunderland (2003). The Day the Sea Went out and Never Came Back. Speechmark Publishing Ltd. 
Margot Sunderland (2003). Ruby and the Rubbish Bin". Speechmark Publishing Ltd. 
Margot Sunderland (2003). Helping Children with Loss: A Guidebook. Speechmark Publishing Ltd. 
Margot Sunderland (2003). How Hattie Hated Kindness. Speechmark Publishing Ltd. 
Margot Sunderland (2003). Teenie Weenie in a Too Big World: A Story for Fearful Children. Speechmark Publishing Ltd. 
Margot Sunderland (2003). Helping Children Locked in Rage or Hate: A Guidebook. Speechmark Publishing Ltd. 
Margot Sunderland (2003). Helping Children with Fear: A Guidebook. Speechmark Publishing Ltd. 
Margot Sunderland (2001). Using Story Telling as a Therapeutic Tool with Children. Speechmark Publishing Ltd. 
Margot Sunderland (2001). Helping Children Who Bottle Up Their Feelings: A Guidebook. Speechmark Publishing Ltd. 
Margot Sunderland (2001). A Pea Called Mildred: A Story to Help Children Pursue Their Hopes and Dreams. Speechmark Publishing Ltd. 
Margot Sunderland (2001). A Nifflenoo Called Nevermind: A Story for Children Who Bottle Up Their Feelings. Speechmark Publishing Ltd. 
Margot Sunderland (2001). Willy and the Wobbly House: A Story for Children Who are Anxious or Obsessional. Speechmark Publishing Ltd. 
Margot Sunderland (2001). A Wibble Called Bipley: A Story for Children Who Have Hardened Their Hearts or Becomes Bullies. Speechmark Publishing Ltd. 
Margot Sunderland (2001). The Frog Who Longed for the Moon to Smile: A Story for Children Who Yearn for Someone They Love. Speechmark Publishing Ltd.

References

External links
 Child Mental Health Centre: Margot Sunderland
 Ms Margot Sunderland receives honorary degree from London Met. London Metropolitan University, 17 December 2007.
 Margot Sunderland's website

English psychologists
Year of birth missing (living people)
Living people